Baïla is a village in the rural community of Suelle, Sindian, Bignona, Ziguinchor, Casamance, Senegal.

History

Boukout, a Jola rite of passage, took place in Baïla for the first time in 1971, but it was 36 years before it was held there again. On August 4, 2007, thousands of people gathered for the occasion. In 2002, the French commune of Houdan committed to providing Baïla with humanitarian aid, both economically and culturally.

Administration
Baïla is one of 16 villages in Suelle.

Geography
The village is located approximately 45 km from Ziguinchor and 15 km from Bignona on the N5 road that leads to Banjul, The Gambia. The nearest towns are Tilaye, Belaye, Diakoye, Diatang, Kaparan, and Diegoun.

Population
According to PEPAM (Water and Sanitation Program for the Millennium), there are 1287 people and 179 households in Baïla. Most of the population is Jola, specifically Jola Fogny, a subgroup within the ethnicity. Pierre Goudiaby Atepa, an architect, was born in Baïla.

Flora
In Baïla, there is a kapok tree, considered sacred by the population, which is 14 centuries old.

See also

Bibliography

External links

Maps, weather and airports for Baila
 Baïla on the PEPAM website
 The village on senegalaisement.com
 The village on ausenegal.com
 Introduction to Baïla: A piece of history revisited by thousands of young people in Jola country

Populated places in the Bignona Department
Arrondissement of Sindian